Janissaries III: Storms of Victory is a  science fiction novel by American writers Jerry Pournelle and Roland J. Green, the third book of Pournelle's Janissaries series (the first was titled simply Janissaries).  It was originally published in 1987 and, unlike the first two books in the series, was not illustrated.  In 1996 Janissaries III: Storms of Victory appeared in a double novel with the second book in the Janissaries series, Janissaries: Clan and Crown as Tran.

Plot

The book continues the adventures of Captain Rick Galloway's Earth-born mercenaries on the planet Tran as they continue to carve out an area of conquest and necessary alliances with Tran's native human population, in order to serve the alien Shalnuksis.  The Shalnuksis are members of a galactic Confederation which uses humans as slave soldiers/administrators (hence the series title "Janissaries"), but they are keeping Tran a secret from the Confederation in order to profit from a drug that can only be grown there.

External links

1987 science fiction novels
Janissaries series
Novels by Jerry Pournelle
Novels by Roland J. Green
1987 American novels
Ace Books books